Nystedt is a surname. Notable people with the surname include:

Knut Nystedt (1915–2014), Norwegian composer
Minna Nystedt (born 1967), Norwegian speed skater

Norwegian-language surnames